The Suriname national basketball team represents Suriname in international competitions. It is administered by the Surinamese Basketball Association.

Current roster

At the 2015 CBC Championship:

|}

| valign="top" |
Head coach

Assistant coaches

Legend

Club – describes lastclub before the tournament
Age – describes ageon 15 June 2015

|}

Hoofdklasse Teams
 Yellow Birds
 SNL (Army)
 Caribbean Little Devils
 Dorenas
 De Schakel
 SCVU
 DE AREND
 FAS

Famous players
 de Jong, Sergio - Yellow Birds
 Kloof, Charlon - Yellow Birds
 Renfrum, Mike - Yellow Birds
 Kranthoven, Perl - SNL
 Bhola, Vincent - De Schakel
 Landolf, Errol
 Adasi, Lorenzo - CLD
 Cabenda, Dwight - Dorenas
 Jiawan, Robby - De Schakel
 Meinzak, Milton - De Schakel
 van Engel, Vincent
 Henar, Jahmal - De Schakel
 Eudoxie, Stefano - De Schakel
 De Randamie, Sergio
 Kamperveen, André
 Sabajo, Raymond
 Bergraaf, Jerry
 Graanoogst, Roberto
 Chin A Sen, Diego

Competitions

CBC Championship
 2015: 5th place

Pan American Games
 1971: 13th place

FIBA World Olympic Qualifying Tournament
 1960: 8th place in the First Pool

References

External links
 Surinamese league on Latinbasket.com 

Basketball in Suriname
Men's national basketball teams
Basketball